HMS Pandora was a 3-gun brig of the Royal Navy, in service from 1833 to 1862.

During this time she was involved in survey work on the west Coast of the Americas from Colombia to Vancouver Island.

From 20 December 1850 to 5 June 1856 her captain was Commander Byron Drury, under whose command she spent four and a half years surveying the New Zealand coast. 
Soundings made off the Cape of Good Hope at the Agulhas Bank in 1851.
Took part in the survey work of New Zealand, between 1851 and 1855. On 8 February 1853, Pandora ran aground at Manukau whilst departing for Onehunga.
In December 1854, surveyed Sumner Bay, including the bar and mouth of the Avon-Heathcote Estuary for the Canterbury Provincial Council. Drury wrote a report and produced a detailed chart of the area, with soundings.

Thomas Kerr her Master.

Notes

References
 Day, Jean D. The Search for Thomas Kerr, Mariner, Mapmaker, Missionary, Meteorologist, 1825 - 1875. Create Space, 2015.
 Lyon, David and Rif Winfield. The Sail and Steam Navy List: All of the Ships of the Royal Navy, 1815-1889. London: Chatham Publishing. 2004, p. 126.

External links
 

Brigs of the Royal Navy
Exploration ships of the United Kingdom
1833 ships
Ships built in Woolwich
Maritime incidents in February 1853